Tun Abdul Ghafar bin Baba (18 February 1925 – 23 April 2006) was a Malaysian politician who served as 6th Deputy Prime Minister of Malaysia from 1986 to 1993.

Life and career
He was born on 18 February 1925 in Kuala Pilah, Negeri Sembilan, the son of an impoverished villager. Ghafar Baba became a teacher and later became a member of the United Malays National Organisation (UMNO) political party, which is part of the Barisan Nasional coalition.

In 1942, he married Toh Puan Asmah Binti Alang and they had twelve children, five of whom have died. In the early 1990s, he married his second wife Toh Puan Heryati Abdul Rahim, with whom he had one child.

In 1986, he was appointed as Deputy Prime Minister by Prime Minister Mahathir Mohamad. Previously, Musa Hitam held the deputy premiership but he resigned, citing irreconcilable differences with Mahathir. On 15 October 1993, during a UMNO election, he was challenged by Anwar Ibrahim. Ghafar Baba was defeated by Anwar and subsequently lost the deputy premiership.

On 23 April 2006, he died at Gleneagles Intan Medical Centre in Kuala Lumpur due to poor heart and lung condition. He had been in critical condition for several months prior to his death. He was buried the same day in an official state funeral at Makam Pahlawan near Masjid Negara, Kuala Lumpur alongside the graves of former Prime Ministers Tun Abdul Razak and Tun Hussein Onn and former Deputy Prime Minister Tun Dr Ismail.

Posts
 Teachers' Union secretary (1946–1948)
 Melaka UMNO Secretary (1951)
 Melaka UMNO Chairman (1955)
 Chief Minister of Malacca (1959–1963)
 UMNO High Council member (1957)
 UMNO Information Chief (1958)
 UMNO Vice-President (1962–1987)
 Barisan Nasional Secretary-General 
 Federal Territory Barisan Nasional Chief 
 Deputy Prime Minister (1986–1993)

Election results

Honours

Honours of Malaysia
  : 
  Grand Commander of the Order of Loyalty to the Crown of Malaysia (SSM) – Tun (1995)
  :
  Grand Knight of the Order of the Territorial Crown (SUMW) – Datuk Seri Utama (2017)

Places named after him

Several places were named after him, including:
 Persiaran Tun Abdul Ghafar Baba, a major road at Peringgit, Malacca.
 Persimpangan Tun Abdul Ghafar, an intersections between Jalan Batu Berendam, Persiaran Tun Abdul Ghafar Baba and Lebuh Ayer Keroh at Peringgit, Malacca.
 The Tun Abdul Ghafar Baba Memorial, a memorial and museum in honour of his achievements located at Persiaran Tun Abdul Ghafar Baba in Peringgit, Malacca.
 MRSM Tun Ghafar Baba a MARA institution boarding school at Jasin, Malacca.
 SMK Ghafar Baba (formerly SMK Masjid Tanah), a secondary school at Masjid Tanah, Malacca.
 Tun Abdul Ghafar Baba Mosque, Sungai Udang, Malacca.
 Six FELDA settlements were renamed after him, they are FELDA Tun Ghafar Machap, FELDA Tun Ghafar Hutan Percha, FELDA Tun Ghafar Menggong, FELDA Tun Ghafar Kemendor, FELDA Tun Ghafar Air Kangkong and FELDA Tun Ghafar Bukit Senggeh.
 Kolej Tun Ghafar Baba, a residential college at Universiti Malaysia Perlis, Kuala Perlis, Perlis
 Kolej Tun Ghafar Baba, a residential college at Universiti Teknologi Malaysia, Skudai, Johor

Notes and references

1925 births
2006 deaths
People from Malacca
People from Negeri Sembilan
Malaysian people of Malay descent
Malaysian people of Minangkabau descent
Malaysian people of Indonesian descent
Malaysian Muslims
Malaysian schoolteachers
United Malays National Organisation politicians
Members of the Dewan Rakyat
Members of the Dewan Negara
Deputy Prime Ministers of Malaysia
Government ministers of Malaysia
Agriculture ministers of Malaysia
Members of the Malacca State Legislative Assembly
Malacca state executive councillors
Chief Ministers of Malacca
Grand Commanders of the Order of Loyalty to the Crown of Malaysia
Sultan Idris Education University alumni